Outwell Village railway station was a station in Outwell, Norfolk on the Wisbech and Upwell Tramway. It opened in 1884 and closed to passengers in 1928. Goods services ran on a while longer, before finishing in 1966. The line provided inspiration for Toby the Tram Engine.

References

Disused railway stations in Norfolk
Former Wisbech and Upwell Tramway stations
Railway stations in Great Britain opened in 1883
Railway stations in Great Britain closed in 1928